Allowat Sakima is a fictional character in the Boy Scouts of America Order of the Arrow ritual induction ceremony. The name is purportedly derived from words found in the LENNI-LENAPE dictionary.

References

Scouting